The ninja lanternshark (Etmopterus benchleyi) is a lanternshark of the family Etmopteridae found in the eastern Pacific Ocean from Nicaragua, south to Panama and Costa Rica. The depth range of collections is from 836 to 1443 m along the continental slope. E. benchleyi is the only Etmopterus species presently known from the Pacific Coast of Central America.

Type
The species was described from eight specimens collected off the Pacific Coast of Central America during an expedition of the Spanish research ship Miguel Oliver by D. Ross Robertson, a researcher at the Smithsonian Tropical Research Institute. One holotype and four paratypes were described and deposited with the United States National Museum of Natural History, Smithsonian Institution, Washington D.C.

Description
The ninja lanternshark is coloured black with the mouth and eyes having white markings around them. This species is distinct from other members of the E. spinax clade in having dense concentrations of dermal denticles closely surrounding the eyes and gill openings.

Origin of scientific name
The shark was identified and named by shark researcher Vicky Vásquez. The specific name benchleyi derives from Peter Benchley, author of the 1974 novel Jaws that was used as a basis for Steven Spielberg's film of the same name.

References

Etmopterus
Fish described in 2015